The 1987 Wisconsin Badgers football team represented the University of Wisconsin–Madison in the 1987 NCAA Division I-A football season.

Schedule

Roster

1988 NFL Draft

References

Wisconsin
Wisconsin Badgers football seasons
Wisconsin Badgers football